US Mobile is an American mobile virtual network operator (MVNO) that uses the T-Mobile and Verizon Wireless networks to provide talk, text, and data services to their customers.

The company was ranked 94th in the Inc 5000's fastest growing private companies with a 3,388% revenue growth over its first 3 full years of existence.

Overview 
US Mobile is an American hybrid network operator on Verizon and T-Mobile's cellular network in the United States. The company has more than 100,000 subscribers in the United States and offers usage analytics, eSIM data roaming, and other services. It provides 24-hour customer service operations from its offices in Islamabad and Karachi, Pakistan.

Business model 
The company offers month-to-month, no-commitment plans that are customizable. US Mobile does not use Verizon's name in its marketing, but offers "Warp 5G" (previously "Super LTE") branded service on the Verizon Wireless network.

The company also sells phones on its own website, working with third-parties and multiple retailers to distribute.

History 
Based in New York, New York, the company was founded in 2015 by Ahmed Khattak (CEO) as a GSM-based service provider. Khattak was born in Pakistan in 1986.

In late 2016, the company had reported roughly 20,000 customers. By 2018, the company's customer base had reached 50,000. In 2020, US Mobile claimed about 250,000 customers.

In 2021, it was announced that US Mobile would offer pooled plans where customers pay for data in bulk to use across multiple devices and users. The pooled plan service saw usage from 300 to 3,000 lines in one month, according to the company's CEO.

In 2021, US Mobile announced an $11.5 Million Series A investment by Volition Capital. In 2022, it was reported that US Mobile has launched 5G C-Band access on its network, adding on to the existing 5G UW mmWave access from Verizon.

References

External links 

 Official website

American companies established in 2015
Internet service providers of the United States
Mobile phone companies of the United States
Mobile virtual network operators
Telecommunications companies established in 2015